Green Point may refer to: 

 Green Point, New South Wales, Australia
 Green Point, Tasmania, Australia
 Green Point, Cape Town, South Africa
 Green Point, Newfoundland, Canada
 Green Point (Antarctica)

See also

Greenpoint (disambiguation)